Clegg-Hill is a surname and could refer to:
Rowland Clegg-Hill, 3rd Viscount Hill (1833–1895) slide to bankruptcy of Hawkstone Park
Rowland Richard Clegg-Hill, 4th Viscount Hill (1863–1923) forced to sell contents and break up estate at Hawkstone Park
Francis William Clegg-Hill, 5th Viscount Hill (1866–1924)
Charles Rowland Clegg-Hill, 6th Viscount Hill (1876–1957)
Gerald Rowland Clegg-Hill, 7th Viscount Hill (1904–1974)
Antony Rowland Clegg-Hill, 8th Viscount Hill (b. 1931-2003)

See also
Clegg (name)
Hill (surname)

Compound surnames